Caltra is a Gaelic Athletic Association club based in Caltra, County Galway, Ireland. The club is a member of the Galway GAA and is primarily a Gaelic football club.

Between 2003 and 2004, it secured the Galway, Connacht and All-Ireland Senior Club Football Championship titles for the first time in its history.

Honours
All-Ireland Senior Club Football Championship (1): 2003–04
Connacht Senior Club Football Championship (1): 2003
Galway Senior Football Championship (1): 2003

Notable players
Men's senior players:
 Declan Meehan
 Tomás Meehan
 Michael Meehan
 Cathal Mannion
 Pádraic Mannion

References

External links
 Caltra.gaa.ie

Gaelic football clubs in County Galway
Gaelic games clubs in County Galway